Bronze Head And Steel Arm is a 1972 Taiwanese and Hong Kong kung fu film.

Cast 

 Tien Peng

Distribution 
The film was banned in Singapore for usage of many "gangland weapons" by Singapore's Board of Film Censors.

References

1972 films
Taiwanese martial arts films
Hong Kong martial arts films
1970s action films
1970s Mandarin-language films
Kung fu films
1970s Hong Kong films